Subiza is the fourth studio album by the Spanish alternative dance band Delorean, released in March 2010 by Mushroom Pillow. True Panther Sounds distributed a worldwide edition in June the same year. Named after the Navarre town in which it was recorded, the album follows the Ayrton Senna EP (2009).

Subiza was very well received by critics, and received a label of Best New Music from Pitchfork. Pitchfork placed it at number 41 on its list "The Top 50 Albums of 2010".

Track listing

References

2010 albums
Delorean (band) albums